Beacon Corner is an unincorporated area in central Alberta, Canada within the Municipal District of Bonnyville No. 87. It is located along Alberta Highway 28.

See also 
List of communities in Alberta

Localities in the Municipal District of Bonnyville No. 87